The SEAT IBL is a concept car which was first shown at the 2011 Frankfurt Motor Show by Spanish car manufacturer SEAT. It is a four-door saloon that was intended to showcase the styling of future SEAT models, and featured a plug in hybrid powertrain. The design was expected to influence the next generation Exeo, which never made it to production however. The IBL was displayed with 20-inch alloy wheels.

References

IBL